Eastern Arizona College (EAC), is a community college in Graham County, Arizona. The main campus is in Thatcher, with satellite locations in Gila County, and Greenlee County.  It is the oldest community college in Arizona and the only community college in Arizona with a marching band.

History
Eastern Arizona College was chartered by the Church of Jesus Christ of Latter-day Saints in 1888.  Classes started in a church room in Central, Arizona in 1890 with 17 students and was called the St. Joseph Stake Academy.  In 1891, classes were moved to Thatcher, Arizona, to be more centralized and due to room constraints.  The school continued to expand, though it was strapped financially.  In 1908, a new 21-room building was opened that would eventually be called Old Main.

In 1932, the Church stated they could no longer afford to support the college financially and would close it unless the local valley could support it.  In 1933, the residents of Graham County passed an initiative funding the school.  The state of Arizona took over the school, changing the name to Gila Junior College of Graham County.  This name was changed to Eastern Arizona Junior College in 1950, then simply Eastern Arizona College in 1966.  In 1962, it was the inaugural member of Arizona's newly created Junior College system.  The 1960s was a time of growth and the college purchased nearby farmland to extend their campus.

In 1972 a fine arts center was completed.  In 1979, two fires within one week destroyed Old Main.  The building was razed and a new administration building was constructed on the site.  During the 1987–1988 school year, Eastern Arizona College celebrated its centennial.

Eastern Arizona College has changed names nine times, growing from a one-room school house to becoming a large community college serving three counties and hosting a satellite campus for a university.

In December 2012, after 10 years of lobbying, Eastern Arizona College launched its first bachelor's degree programs in a partnership with Arizona State University.  The bachelor's degree programs include nursing and business.

Ownership
EAC is a state-sponsored community college and comes under the guidance and control of the state of Arizona.

Campus
The main campus  sits in the center of the Upper Gila River Valley with Mt. Graham towering to the south and the Gila River to the north. The buildings on the campus are plain, while the grass, trees, and flower beds on EAC's campus are impeccably maintained year-round.

On September 15, 2007, Eastern Arizona College dedicated their Bell Tower.  The tower is adjacent to the administration building, between the north and south campuses.

Housing
Eastern Arizona College provides dormitories for single students.  EAC has the following houses:
 Mark Allen
 Wesley Taylor
 Nellie Lee
 Residence towers (three towers)

Married student housing is not available on-campus. Most married couples are able to find off-campus apartments.

In addition to on-campus housing, there are many off-campus places available for rent. EAC has a housing office with information for on- and off-campus living.

Academics
Eastern Arizona College is divided into nine academic divisions:
 Business
 Communicative Arts
 Fine Arts
 Health and Physical Education
 Industrial Technology Education
 Liberal Studies
 Mathematics
 Science and Allied Health
 Social Sciences

Museum
Eastern Arizona College is the home of the Mills Collection, the life-work of avocational archaeologists Jack and Vera Mills. The Mills conducted extensive excavations on archaeological sites in Southeastern Arizona and Western New Mexico from the 1940s through the 1970s. They restored numerous pottery vessels and amassed more than 600 whole and restored pots, as well as over 5,000 other artifacts. Most of their work was carried out on private land in southeastern Arizona and western New Mexico. They donated their collection of some 600 whole vessels to EAC, on condition that their collection be placed on permanent public display.

Mascot
The college's mascot is "Gila Hank," a Gila monster, indigenous to the region.

Notable alumni

 H. Verlan Andersen, LDS general authority
 Mike Bellamy, CFL player
 Christo Bilukidi, NFL player
 Del M. Clawson, politician
 Henry Eyring, chemist
 Mark Gastineau, NFL player
 Adarius Glanton, NFL player
 Tay Glover-Wright, NFL player
 Michael Haynes, NFL player
 Mitch Hoopes, NFL player
 Orlando Huff, NFL Player
 Mike James, NBA player
 Walter S. Johnson, businessman and philanthropist
 Spencer W. Kimball, religious leader
 Bronzell Miller, NFL player and actor
 John Mitchell, NFL assistant coach
 Jeremy Nelson, visual effects artist
 Nick Nolte, actor
 Spencer J. Palmer, religious scholar
 Nolan Richardson, college basketball coach
 Brandon Stewart, CFL player
 James Tolkan, actor
 Frank R. Zapata, United States District judge

References

External links
 Official website

Eastern Arizona College
Buildings and structures in Graham County, Arizona
Education in Graham County, Arizona
School districts in Graham County, Arizona
Educational institutions established in 1888
Universities and colleges formerly affiliated with the Church of Jesus Christ of Latter-day Saints
Community colleges in Arizona
1888 establishments in Arizona Territory